Adama Iye Iyayi Lamikanra is the current Chief Judge of Rivers State. She was sworn into office as acting Chief Judge on 15 January 2016 to replace Daisy W. Okocha who retired on the same day. She was then sworn in as Chief Judge on 8 March 2016.

References

Living people
Chief Judges of Rivers State
Rivers State judges appointed by Ezenwo Nyesom Wike
Year of birth missing (living people)
Women judges